Super Standard is an album by pianist Kenny Barron, bassist Jay Leonhart and drummer Al Foster (billed for contractual reasons as the Super Trio) recorded in New York in 2004 and released on the Japanese Venus label.

Reception 

In the review on Allmusic, Ken Dryden noted "As one of the busiest pianists around, Barron has a wealth of music at his fingertips and he doesn't disappoint with fresh approaches to standards and jazz compositions that make up this session".

Track listing 
 "All of Me" (Gerald Marks, Seymour Simons) – 5:27
 "Bye Bye Blackbird" (Ray Henderson, Mort Dixon) – 7:20
 "Cherokee" (Ray Noble) – 5:02
 "Cleopatra's Dream" (Bud Powell) – 3:59
 "Doxy" (Sonny Rollins) – 6:48
 "Misty" (Erroll Garner, Johnny Burke) – 8:11
 "Stolen Moments" (Oliver Nelson) – 5:51
 "Summer Night" (Harry Warren, Al Dubin) – 4:21
 "Sunset and the Mockingbird" (Duke Ellington) – 5:32
 "Sweet and Lovely" (Gus Arnheim, Harry Tobias, Jules Lemare) – 5:47
 "Willow Weep for Me" (Ann Ronell) – 6:18
 "Yesterdays" (Jerome Kern, Otto Harbach) – 3:02

Personnel 
Kenny Barron – piano
Jay Leonhart – bass
Al Foster – drums

References 

Kenny Barron albums
2004 albums
Venus Records albums